Knights Landing (formerly, Baltimore and East Grafton) is a census-designated place in Yolo County, California, United States, founded by William Knight. It is located on the Sacramento River around 25 miles northwest of Sacramento in the northeastern portion of the county. Knights Landing's ZIP Code is 95645 and its area code 530.  It lies at an elevation of 36 feet (11 m). The 2010 census reported that Knights Landing had a population of 995.

Geography
According to the United States Census Bureau, the CDP covers an area of 0.5 square miles (1.3 km), all of it land.

Climate
According to the Köppen Climate Classification system, Knights Landing has a warm-summer Mediterranean climate, abbreviated "Csa" on climate maps.

Demographics

The 2010 United States Census reported that Knights Landing had a population of 995. The racial makeup of Knights Landing was 560 (56.3%) White, 4 (0.4%) African American, 10 (1.0%) Native American, 7 (0.7%) Asian, 0 (0.0%) Pacific Islander, 338 (34.0%) from other races, and 76 (7.6%) from two or more races. Hispanic or Latino of any race were 644 persons (64.7%).

The Census reported that 995 people (100% of the population) lived in households, 0 (0%) lived in non-institutionalized group quarters, and 0 (0%) were institutionalized.

There were 317 households, out of which 128 (40.4%) had children under the age of 18 living in them, 171 (53.9%) were opposite-sex married couples living together, 43 (13.6%) had a female householder with no husband present, 17 (5.4%) had a male householder with no wife present.  There were 18 (5.7%) unmarried opposite-sex partnerships, and 2 (0.6%) same-sex married couples or partnerships. 76 households (24.0%) were made up of individuals, and 35 (11.0%) had someone living alone who was 65 years of age or older. The average household size was 3.14.  There were 231 families (72.9% of all households); the average family size was 3.74.

The population was spread out, with 265 people (26.6%) under the age of 18, 112 people (11.3%) aged 18 to 24, 238 people (23.9%) aged 25 to 44, 268 people (26.9%) aged 45 to 64, and 112 people (11.3%) who were 65 years of age or older. The median age was 34.3 years. For every 100 females, there were 108.6 males. For every 100 females age 18 and over, there were 103.9 males.

The homeowner vacancy rate was 2.7%; the rental vacancy rate was 9.6%.  655 people (65.8% of the population) lived in owner-occupied housing units and 340 people (34.2%) lived in rental housing units.

History
Knights Landing was founded in 1843, by Dr. William Knight, a practicing physician from Baltimore. Maryland. William Knight built on a mound that marked the ancient meeting place of Native Americans inhabiting the regions about Cache Creek and the Sacramento River. The site early demonstrated its importance as a steamboat landing and point of communication between the people east and west of the big central river. When the town was laid out in 1849, it was originally called Baltimore, but an agreement over the sale of the new town lots could not be amicably arranged and the title Baltimore was lost. Knight established a ferry there, which afterwards passed to the ownership of J. W. Snowball. In those days the ferry tolls were $1 for a man and horse; a team and wagon cost $5. In 1850, S. R. Smith kept a hotel in the settlement and in 1853, Charles F. Reed surveyed and laid out a townsite and was officially given the name of Knight's Landing. That year, J. W. Snowball and J. J. Perkins opened a large general merchandise store on the Native American mound. On  January 1, 1854, Capt. J. H. Updegraff opened his hotel with $10 tickets to a grand New Years party. A steamer was run from Sacramento for the accommodation of guests. The establishment was called the "Yolo House." In 1860 D. N. Hershey and George Glascock erected a brick hotel, which took the place of the Yolo House, that inn being retired to the status of a private residence

On March 25, 1890, the Knight's Landing branch of the Southern Pacific Railroad was completed and ready for business, and later the completion of the bridge across the river added immensely to the prosperity of the town.  The famous and now merged Southern Pacific Railroad Company once had a line from Davis, CA, via Woodland, CA through Knights Landing, and the line continued to Marysville, CA, via a junction in Yuba City, CA.  This 1879 map shows the railroad from Woodland almost to East Grafton (which contains Knights Landing): http://www.historicmapworks.com/Map/US/159571/West+Grafton+Township++East+Grafton+Township++Cacheville+Township/Yolo+County+1879/California/.  The line now stops a few miles northeast of Woodland.

Grafton Elementary was the only public school in the community. It closed June 23, 2009. The area is served by Woodland Joint Unified School District. In 2010, the Science and Technology Academy of Knights Landing opened on the former Grafton Elementary campus as a charter school.

Knights Landing Cemetery (just south of town on County Road 102) is one of several purported final resting places of the stagecoach bandit Charles Bolles, a.k.a. Black Bart. If present, the grave is unmarked.

References

External links

Census-designated places in Yolo County, California
Populated places established in 1843
Census-designated places in California
Populated places on the Sacramento River
1843 establishments in Alta California